The AZAL PFK 2015–16 season is AZAL's eleventh Azerbaijan Premier League season, and twelfth season in their history. It is their second full season with Tarlan Ahmadov as manager, during which they will participate in the Azerbaijan Cup as well as the League.

Squad

Transfers

Summer

In:

Out:

Winter

In:

Out:

Competitions

Azerbaijan Premier League

Results summary

Results

League table

Azerbaijan Cup

Squad statistics

Appearances and goals

|-
|colspan="14"|Players who appeared for AZAL but left during the season:

|}

Goal scorers

Disciplinary record

Notes
Qarabağ have played their home games at the Tofiq Bahramov Stadium since 1993 due to the ongoing situation in Quzanlı.

References

External links 
 AZAL PFC Official Web Site
 AZAL PFC  at PFL.AZ
 AZAL PFC Official Facebook Page

AZAL PFC seasons
Azerbaijani football clubs 2015–16 season